The Appalachian Trail Conservancy (ATC) (formerly Appalachian Trail Conference) is a nonprofit organization dedicated to the conservation of the Appalachian Trail, a route in the eastern United States that runs from Maine to Georgia.  Founded in 1925, the ATC is responsible for the day-to-day management of the Appalachian Trail under a cooperative agreement executed with the National Park Service. It is the lead non-governmental organization in protecting the trail's , 250,000 acre (1,000 km²) greenway and coordinates the work of some thirty-one Appalachian Trail maintaining clubs performing almost all of the on-the-ground maintenance work. The National Trails System Act, which established the National Trails System and brought the Appalachian Trail into the federal estate, enabled the trail to be managed as it had been since 1925, with central agency and NGO (ATC) coordination, but most trail work being performed by, in 2019, almost 6,000 volunteers.

The ATC is headquartered in Harpers Ferry, West Virginia.

History
The Appalachian Trail was originally conceived by forester Benton MacKaye who envisioned a grand trail that would connect a series of farms and wilderness work/study camps for city-dwellers. In 1922, at the suggestion of Major William A. Welch, director of the Palisades Interstate Park Commission, MacKaye's plan was publicized by Raymond H. Torrey with a story in the New York Evening Post under a full page banner headline reading "A Great Trail from Maine to Georgia!"; the trail component of MacKaye's proposal was quickly adopted by the new Palisades Interstate Park Trail Conference as their main project, and on January 4, 1924, the first twenty-mile (32 km) stretch from the Hudson to the Ramapo Rivers was complete. The entire trail was connected in 1937, though almost every section has been relocated from their original locations to improve footpath sustainability or provide better protection from development or encroachments.

The ATC was formed in Washington, D.C., on March 2 and 3, 1925, with Major Welch as chairman and Torrey as treasurer. In 1927, Welch was replaced by Judge Arthur Perkins and in 1928, J. Ashton Allis became Treasurer.

In 1929, Perkins recruited Ned Anderson to blaze the Connecticut leg of the trail. This section is a 50-mile stretch through the northwest corner of the state from Dog Tail Corners in Webatuck, New York, to Bear Mountain at the Massachusetts border.  Anderson worked dually as a section manager for both Connecticut Forest & Park Association and the ATC. With his volunteers, he continued to maintain the trail until his retirement in 1948. Today, that section of the trail is maintained by the Appalachian Mountain Club.

Activities
The ATC is committed not only to trail maintenance and large landscape conservation, but to education, science and awareness as well. The trail's size, uniqueness and the environmental effects of it and on it can provide valuable insights and advances for science and ecology. The ATC currently has a MEGA-Transect scientific study underway, which will use data collected (species of flora, fauna, wildlife, weather/climate effects and more) to provide critical information toward preservation on a global scale. The Conservancy strives to heighten awareness via the "ATC's Community Recognition Program" or "Trail Towns" program that recognizes and highlights the communities through which the trail's 2,000 miles run. As well, the ATC's "A Trail To Every Classroom" is a school program that utilized the trail to teach students about conservation, preservation, earth science and ecology.

Halfway point pictures

Because The ATC Headquarters in Harpers Ferry is located roughly at the halfway point for the Appalachian Trail, a photograph at ATC headquarters is a standard ritual for those hikers intending to walk the entire path. One of the functions of the ATC, as the lead organization in managing and protecting the A.T., is to maintain the official 2,000-miler registry of all those who have completed the A.T. Another, less official function, is the documentation of  hikers who reach the halfway point.  These hikers, whether hiking Northbound, Southbound, or Section hiking (completing portions in multiple trips) almost universally stop by the ATC headquarters for a few minutes. Having a simple Polaroid under the ATC sign after hiking 1,000 miles is a milestone anticipated by many hikers. The pictures are signed and numbered in the order the hikers arrive. Although hikers are not entered into the official 2,000-miler registry until completing the full Appalachian Trail, the ritual is nonetheless a memorable recognition of their progress.

Notable affiliated trail maintenance clubs
 Appalachian Mountain Club (AMC)
 Dartmouth Outing Club
 Georgia Appalachian Trail Club
 Green Mountain Club
 Maine Appalachian Trail Club
 New York–New Jersey Trail Conference
 Potomac Appalachian Trail Club

See also
 Appalachian Development Highway System (ADHS) (in the eastern US)
 Appalachian Long Distance Hikers Association

References

 Myles, William J., Harriman Trails, A Guide and History, The New York–New Jersey Trail Conference, New York, 1999.

External links
 Appalachian Trail Conservancy
 Doris Tomaselli, author of Ned Anderson: Connecticut's Appalachian Trailblazer – Small Town Renaissance Man

Appalachian Trail
Hiking organizations in the United States
Environmental organizations based in the United States